Cocumola is a small Italian town close to the Adriatic coast and about 42 km distant from Lecce. Administratively it counts as a frazione of the commune of Minervino di Lecce, and falls within the province of Lecce in the Apulia region of south-east Italy.

Frazioni of the Province of Lecce
Cities and towns in Apulia
Localities of Salento